"Jumpsuit" is a song written and recorded by the American musical duo Twenty One Pilots. It was released on July 11, 2018, as the first of the singles from their fifth studio album Trench (2018), alongside "Nico and the Niners". It was the first song to be released by the band after a year-long public silence. The track was nominated for Best Rock Song at the 61st Annual Grammy Awards.

Background and release 
The band started working on the song during the Emotional Roadshow World Tour. Tyler Joseph, the band's frontman, created the bass riff during that time and would play it during sound checks before shows. Following the tour, the band withdrew from public life in order to record the album Trench. Joseph revealed in an interview with NME that the album was originally supposed to be a "lighter sounding and softer record," but "then he wrote 'Jumpsuit' which ruined that." On July 6, 2018, the band broke their year-long silence by an email of a closing eye with the words "ARE YOU STILL SLEEPING?" Three days later, they returned to social media for the first time in their year-long hiatus, posting a clip from the official video for the song inside of an opening eye. On July 11, the song was then released along with its music video.

Composition 
"Jumpsuit" is a hard rock, alternative rock, and electronic rock song, containing nu metal-styled hooks. It lasts for a duration of three minutes and fifty-eight seconds. According to the sheet music published at Musicnotes.com by Alfred Music, it is written in the time signature of common time, with a moderately fast tempo of 127 beats per minute. The song is composed in the key of B minor while Tyler Joseph's vocal range spans one octave and four notes, from a low of D3 to a high of G4. Lyrically, the song features Clancy, the main character from the conceptual world of "Trench", calling for protection from the bishops, the leaders of the city Dema. The song was described by Rolling Stone as having "distorted bass guitar, crisp drumming and dark washes of synth" with frontman Tyler Joseph's vocals building from "a near-whisper to a full-throated scream, to an atmospheric falsetto." Idolator described its sound as alternating between "semi-acoustic and hard rock".

Music video 

A music video for "Jumpsuit" was released on July 11, 2018.  It was directed by Andrew Donoho, who had previously directed the music videos for the duo's songs "Heathens" and "Heavydirtysoul". The video was filmed in Thórsmörk, Iceland. On July 12, 2018, the music video for "Jumpsuit" surpassed "Heathens" for the most YouTube views in one day for the band (5.2 million), and as of March 2022, has over 120 million views.

The video begins with the car from the "Heavydirtysoul" music video still smoldering, before suddenly catching on fire. Lead-singer Tyler Joseph climbs onto the car and states to the viewers: "We've been here the whole time, you were asleep, it's time to wake up." The scene then cuts to a valley where Joseph is seen laying unconscious in a stream of water, he wakes up and observes his surroundings when mysterious people in yellow-taped outfits appear upon the clifftops of the valley, watching him. As he makes his way through the valley, he is pursued by a red-hooded figure on a white stallion who upon reaching him, coats his neck in black paint. Following this, he is seen following the red-hooded figure on the horse in a trance-like state. The people in yellow toss petals at the bishop and Joseph, breaking him out of his trance and disorientating the bishop's stallion, allowing him to attempt an escape. However, Joseph trips while running and is captured by the bishop. The video ends cutting back to the original scene, with Joseph opening the back of the flaming car, grabbing a yellow jumpsuit and putting it on before walking away.

The clip was named one of the twelve best music videos of 2018 by the British rock music magazine Kerrang!.

Reception
Spin was critical of the song, finding the lyrics and backstory confusing, and feeling that its progressive rock-inspired song structure would not catch on at contemporary pop music. Chris Willman, writing for Variety, was more positive, saying "The color-coded storytelling of 'Jumpsuit' doesn't get in the way of its thunderous pleasures". PopMatters' Joshua Copperman called the song the band's "heaviest, even best song to date".

The song was named the Hottest Record of the Year in 2018 by BBC Radio 1 during DJ Annie Mac's radio show. Billboard also deemed the song the best rock song of 2018. Loudwire featured it on their "40 best hard rock songs of 2018" list, placing it at No. 28. The track was nominated for Best Rock Song at the 61st Annual Grammy Awards.

Commercial performance
"Jumpsuit" debuted at No. 60 on the Billboard Hot 100 the week of July 21, 2018, with 11.4 million airplay audience impressions, 5.2 million U.S. streams and 22,000 downloads sold according to Nielsen Music, and peaked at No. 50 the following week. The same month, "Jumpsuit" peaked at number one on the Billboard Alternative Songs chart, the band's fourth on the list. By taking two weeks to peak at number one, "Jumpsuit" became the fastest song to reach number one on the Alternative Songs chart in the 2010s. The song also peaked at No. 6 on the Hot Rock Songs chart. Later, the song peaked at number one on the Rock Airplay chart, marking the band's third on the list.

Live performances 
Twenty One Pilots first played the song live at the Brixton Academy for their concert "A Complete Diversion", on stage with a flaming car and yellow petals from the original music video. They also performed the song at the 2018 American Music Awards with the same type of setting. It is the opener of the set list for The Bandito Tour, which took place from October 2018 to June 2019. Joseph revealed that the track was his favorite song to play live, calling it a "very useful song" due to the fact that "the song gives off the energy that is required to be injected into a room that can sustain for the course of an entire set."

Track listing

Credits and personnel
Credits adapted from the liner notes of Trench and Tidal.

Recording and management
Published by Warner-Tamerlane Publishing Corp. (BMI) and Stryker Joseph Music (BMI)
Recorded at Tyler Joseph's home studio (Columbus, Ohio) and United Recording Studios (Hollywood, California)
Mastered at Sterling Sound (New York, New York)

Twenty One Pilots
 Tyler Joseph  – vocals, bass, synthesizers, guitar, piano, programming, songwriting, production
 Josh Dun  – drums, percussion
Additional personnel
 Paul Meany  – synthesizers, programming, co-production
 Adam Hawkins  – mixing
 Chris Gehringer  – mastering

Usage in media
The song appears on the soundtrack for the video game NHL 19, in addition to an episode of Riverdale.

Charts

Weekly charts

Year-end charts

Certifications

References 

2018 songs
2018 singles
American hard rock songs
Fueled by Ramen singles
Songs written by Tyler Joseph
Twenty One Pilots songs